Hiram Meléndez-Juarbe (born in 1976 in San Juan, Puerto Rico) was a member of the Puerto Rico Commission on Civil Rights. He is a Professor and former Associate Dean at the University of Puerto Rico School of Law, where he teaches constitutional law, privacy and technology, copyright and intellectual property topics, cyberlaw, administrative law and seminars on constitutional law and cyberspace. He is founder of the UPR New Technologies, Intellectual Property and Society Clinic and co-legal lead of Creative Commons Puerto Rico. He graduated from the University of Puerto Rico (BA 1997, JD 2000), Harvard University (LL.M. 2002) and New York University (LL.M. 2008, SJD 2013).  He is co-founder of the blawg .

References 

Puerto Rican academics
Living people
People from San Juan, Puerto Rico
University of Puerto Rico faculty
University of Puerto Rico alumni
New York University alumni
Harvard Law School alumni
1976 births